John Bothwell may refer to:
 John Bothwell (bishop) (1926–2014), Canadian Anglican bishop and author
 John Bothwell (trade unionist) (1909–1994), British trade union leader 
 John Bothwell, Lord Holyroodhouse (1550–1609), 16th-century Scottish judge